Stephen Decatur Sr. (June 1751 – November 11, 1808) was an American privateer in the Revolutionary War and later in the Quasi-War was commissioned as a captain in the United States Navy.  He was the father of Stephen Decatur Jr.

Life 
Born in Newport, Rhode Island, Decatur was a merchant captain before the Revolution. He married Ann Pine; in addition to their son, they had two other children, Lieutenant James Decatur, who was killed in action in 1804 during the Barbary Wars, and Ann Decatur McKnight.

During the American Revolution he commanded the Royal Louis and the Fair American.

With the outbreak of the Quasi War with France, Decatur was commissioned as a captain in the United States Navy on May 11, 1798.

On May 5, 1798, Decatur was placed in command of the converted merchant ship  and sailed in the first American Navy squadron to cross the Atlantic along with his son Stephen Decatur Jr. Delaware captured a French privateer, La Croyable, off Great Egg Harbor, N.J., on 7 July 1798. The U.S. Navy purchased La Croyable on 30 July 1798, and renamed her . From 14 July to 23 September, Delaware cruised in the West Indies, often in company with the frigate , and together the ships took two privateers prize. During her second cruise in the West Indies, between 15 December 1798 and 20 May 1799, she took another prize.

On October 12, 1799, he was inducted as a Mason in St. John's Lodge #1 in Newport, Rhode Island.

In 1800, Decatur commissioned Philadelphia, the very vessel that his son later burned several months after it ran aground and was captured near Tripoli harbor in 1803.

In accordance with the Peace Establishment Act of 1801, which greatly reduced the United States Army and Navy, Decatur was discharged from the Navy on October 22, 1801.

He died in 1808, at his country home "Millsdale" in Frankford, Pennsylvania.  He is interred next to his famous son at St. Peter's Church in Philadelphia.

References

External links

Drawing of Decatur

Bibliography

 
 

1752 births
1808 deaths
Continental Navy officers
United States Navy officers
American military personnel of the Quasi-War
People from Newport, Rhode Island
People of colonial Rhode Island
Burials at St. Peter's churchyard, Philadelphia